Stieg Hedlund (born 1965) is a computer and video game designer, artist, and writer with over 25 years of experience. He has worked on more than 30 games in the video game industry. He is best known for his work in action RPGs, and has also worked on games on real-time strategy, tactical shooter, beat-'em-up and action-adventure games.

Design Philosophy
Despite his lengthy resume, Hedlund is not known for having the "rock-star attitude" that is common among well-known designers in the industry. Hedlund has said that he is "more interested in how the audience feels" about his games than in the "accolades of (his) fellow game designers". He has further stated in interviews that he believes in a collaborative environment and that his door is "always open to anyone who had a design idea".

Works

Raised in the Chicago area, Hedlund contributed to and co-ran a small but successful minicomic during high school. He became a pen and paper RPG designer "by the age of 16" after exploring "scenario creation, rule variants, balancing" and the like in Dungeons & Dragons.

Hedlund began his career in the electronic entertainment field in 1987 at Infinity Software, a small publisher of games for the Macintosh, Commodore 64 and Amiga.

Hedlund moved on to Japanese publisher Koei in 1990, which had established a North American subsidiary, Koei Corporation, in California two years earlier. Working at Koei both in Northern California and Japan, he was the lead designer for and/or originated a number of games including Liberty or Death, Celtic Tales: Balor of the Evil Eye, Gemfire and Saiyuki: Journey West. In 1995, shortly after Hedlund left the company, the subsidiary ceased its game development efforts.

After working on an unreleased Lord of the Ringsbased title for Electronic Arts in the early '90s, Hedlund interviewed with Condor Software (the future Blizzard North), to potentially work on Justice League. According to Hedlund the game concept "wasn't very appealing to me". He instead began working for the Sega Technical Institute (STI) in 1994, where, as an artist and game designer, he worked on titles like Comix Zone, The Ooze and Sonic X-treme. Hedlund has stated that in addition to his gaming experience, his experience "living and working in Japan" was another reason he was hired on at STI, since STI collaborated and integrated more game professionals from Japan than any of Sega’s other studios.

In 1996, three years after he first interviewed with the company, Hedlund ran into the three founders of Condor (STI and Condor were closely located on the eastern edge of the SF peninsula). He was impressed by the potential of their latest game, Diablo, and immediately joined the team taking on the lead design role. Three months before the release of Diablo, Blizzard acquired Condor and renamed the company Blizzard North. Diablo would go on to become one of the most highly rated games of 1996.

In the wake of Diablo'''s success, Hedlund designed Diablo II, which was released in 2000. The title went on to become the second-best-selling PC game of all time, the number-one-selling RPG on the PC with over 15 million units sold and, according to the 2003 edition of the Guinness Book of World Records, the fastest-selling computer game ever sold, with more than 1 million units sold in the first two weeks of availability. According to the 2008 Guinness Gamer's Edition, the title still holds the record. Diablo II was also the recipient of many of the game industry's most prestigious awards, including the 2001 Academy of Interactive Arts & Sciences Game of the Year Award.

While at Blizzard, he also participated in the design of both StarCraft and the Diablo II: Lord of Destruction expansion pack. StarCraft was the best-selling PC game of 1998 and received numerous Game of the Year awards. Diablo II: LOD was released in 2001, and helped to “reinforce the staying power of an already legendary RPG”. It too received numerous awards, including several for Best Expansion Pack of the Year, and tied with Baldur’s Gate II for Best RPG of the Year.

On April 17, 2000, Hedlund announced that he would be leaving Blizzard North "as soon as his responsibilities for Diablo II (had) been fulfilled" in order to start a new game-development firm called Full-On Amusement Company with business partners, programmers, and artists from Virgin Interactive, Sega, Sony Computer Entertainment, Electronic Arts, and Maxis. During this time, Hedlund was also named as the designer to collaborate with five-time Academy Award-nominated director David Lynch on his unreleased Woodcutters from Fiery Ships game project.

Later in 2000, Hedlund joined Konami as the company's Creative Director and worked on titles such as the iconic Frogger and Contra series. In 2002, he went to work as Creative Director for Ubisoft/ Red Storm Entertainment on games such as Tom Clancy's Ghost Recon 2 and Tom Clancy's Rainbow Six: Lockdown, as well as contributing to Tom Clancy's Ghost Recon: Advanced Warfighter. He also spent some time with Oddworld Inhabitants doing foundational work for Oddworld: Stranger's Wrath.

Beginning in August 2004, Hedlund signed on with Perpetual Entertainment as Design Director for Gods & Heroes: Rome Rising, officially announced in March 2005. The game was shown at E3 2006 and received several "Best of Show" awards, with particular notice being paid to its innovative "minion" system. Although it was well into “content complete” beta testing by September 2007, the technology behind the game could not be stabilized, and after numerous delays and several rounds of layoffs the game was "indefinitely suspended" in mid-October 2007 even as further stability testing was underway. Hedlund left the company during its ensuing dissolution in the months that followed. Eventually the game got published in June 2011.

After leaving Perpetual, Hedlund founded Turpitude an independent game development firm, along with partner Natalie Fay. As the Chief Creative Officer for Turpitude Design, Stieg oversees the team of game designers and producers working on the company's projects. Turpitude would fade into obscurity, and Hedlund would go on to work for nWay Inc. and Zynga.

Recognitions and awards
IGN named Hedlund as being one of the top 100 game creators of all time (number 62). His games have an average rating of 88%, and have received numerous awards including:Diablo: GameSpot's Game of the Year Award, and No. 1 spot of all PC games.StarCraft: GameSpot's Greatest Games of All Time, Academy of Interactive Arts & Sciences Game of the Year, Computer Gaming World Game of the Year, PC PowerPlay's Game of the Year, PC Gamer's Real-time strategy Game of the Year, Games Domain Strategy Game of the Year, GameInformer's 35th Greatest Game of All Time.Diablo II'': Guinness Book of World Records Fastest Selling Computer Game Ever Sold, Interactive Achievement Awards Computer Game of the Year, Interactive Achievement Awards Computer Role Playing Game of the Year, Interactive Achievement Awards Game of the Year, PC Gamer No. 16 "50 Best Games of All Time", PC Gamer No. 82 "Top 100 Games", Computer and Video Games No. 25, "The 101 Best PC Games Ever", GamePro No. 11 "The 32 Best PC Games", Destructoid No. 7 "Top Video Games of the Decade".

References

1965 births
Living people
American video game designers
Video game designers
New Trier High School alumni
Hedlund, Steig
American people of Swedish descent